Tilly Birds is an alternative rock band formed in Bangkok, Thailand, by lead vocalist Anuroth Ketlekha (Third) and guitarist Nutdanai Chuchat (Billy). They have been a trio with drummer Thuwanon Tantiwattanaworakul (Milo). The band's early releases were independent. In 2019, their major-label debut album Poo Diew (ผู้เดียว), released through Gene Lab Records, GMM Grammy. They are known for Same Page? (คิดแต่ไม่ถึง Khit Tae Mai Thueng) and Just Being Friendly (เพื่อนเล่น ไม่เล่นเพื่อน Phuean Len Mai Len Phuean).

History

Early years
The band was formed by Third and Billy when they were in high school and their name came from a play on words in Thai, where the vowels in the names of Third and Billy are switched. The band would pick up members with Milo, Bookies and later Babe. They were invited to join the band when Third met them in the TU Folksong Club of Thammasat University. The band had been writing songs in English until 2017 which marked the year that they started writing songs in Thai which led to their first EP being released in May, 2017.

Entry into Gene Lab
The band would join the TV show Band Lab, a singing contest to find artists for the newly founded Gene Lab label at the time. They were picked as finalists in the show and they released their first single under the label with the name Ordinary (จากกันด้วยดี Chak Kan Duai De). Babe would leave the band during the run of the show. They would release their second single under Gene Lab, Broken (อภัย Aphai).

Success
They would start making their album after the release of Ordinary with them releasing their song Status (แค่พี่น้อง Khae Phi Nong) in April 2019, followed by The One (ผู้เดียว Phu Diao) in August 2019, followed by ineednoone (อยู่ได้ ได้อยู่ Yu Dai Dai Yu) in October 2019, followed by Bangkok Winter (ฤดูหนาว Ruedu Nao). Then they  released their hit single Same Page? in March 2020 which peaked at number 1 of Spotify, Cat Radio and Apple Music charts making them well-known all over Thailand overnight. The song was so famous, their label greenlit their project with Three Man Down to create a mashup of their songs, Fon Tok Mai (ฝนตกไหม) and Same Page? with the intentionally unwieldy name ความคิดถึงที่ฉันได้เคยส่งไปในคืนที่ฝนโปรยลงมา Khwam Khit Thueng Thi Chan Dai Khoei Song Pai Nai Khuen Thi Fon Proi Long Ma.  They would continue to release songs for their albums; When The Film's Over (ยังคงสวยงาม Yang Khong Suai-ngam) in July 2020, Who I Am (ฉันมันเป็นใคร Chan Man Pen Khrai) in August 2020, My Black Mirror (ปลายนิ้ว Plai Niu), Cut To The Chase (เลิก! Loek!), What's Left... (ผู้เดียว Part 2 Phu Diao Part 2), Worth The Wait (แค่เธอเข้ามา Khae Thoe Khao Ma), Just So You Know (ให้กอดของฉันบอกทุกอย่าง Hai Kot Khong Chan Bok Thuk Yang), Unspoken (ไม่รู้สึก Mai Rusuek) in September 2020. They would release a cover of Wasan Chotikul's song Hai Toe (ให้เธอ) in September 2020. In May 2021 they released their single Just Being Friendly (เพื่อนเล่น ไม่เล่นเพื่อน Puean Len Mai Len Puean) which peaked at number 1 in Apple Music, Spotify, Joox and local radio charts. This song is the start to their next album. In August 2021 They would release Can't Keep Up (ลู่วิ่ง Lu Wing) which peaked at number 2 on Spotify charts behind their song Just Being Friendly. This song would reach one million views on YouTube in three days.

Political activism
In the 2020-2021 Thai protests, the band supported the pro-democracy movement with Third participating in the protest on 18 July 2021  The band would come out to support the Musicians and Crew Association of Thailand (MCAT) proposals to help the pub and music business. In the 10 August 2021 protest, Third attended and posted a picture of him in the protest holding a sign saying "วิ่งวิ่งอยู่อย่างนี้ วิ่งวิ่งอยู่กับที่ ไม่ไปไหน..ประเทศไทย" (Run, run like this, Run, run in place, Don't go anywhere... Thailand) a modified lyric from the chorus of Can't Keep Up, with the band's Twitter page quote tweeting; "เอเนอร์จี้ไปม็อบและขายของไปด้วย" (Energy of going to the protest and also promoting [your song]).

Discography

Album

Extended plays

Singles
Heart in a Cage - 2014.11.01
Like A Dead Man - 2015.04.18
Unwanted - 2016.01.16
The Rest - 2016.08.07
Crying Window - 2016.29.12
เพื่อ - 2017.03.31
เขาเป็นใคร - 2017.05.29
เรื่องดี ๆ - 2017.08.30
จากกันด้วยดี (Ordinary) - 2018.09.18
อภัย (Broken) - 2019.01.17
แค่พี่น้อง (Status) - 2019.04.30
ผู้เดียว (The One) - 2019.08.13
อยู่ได้ ได้อยู่ (ineednoone) - 2019.10.29
ฤดูหนาว (Bangkok Winter) Feat.PAAM - 2019.12.17
คิด(แต่ไม่)ถึง (Same Page?) - 2020.03.20
ยังคงสวยงาม (When The Film's Over) - 2020.07.14
ฉันมันเป็นใคร (Who I Am) - 2020.08.18
เพื่อนเล่น ไม่เล่นเพื่อน (Just Being Friendly) Feat.MILLI - 2021.04.27
ลู่วิ่ง (Can't Keep Up) - 2021.08.03
เดอะแบก (Baggage) - 2021.10.15
เบื่อคนขี้เบื่อ (I'm Not Boring, You're Just Bored) - 2021.11.11 (Joox), 2021.11.19 (Other Platforms)
ถ้าเราเจอกันอีก (Until Then) - 2022.04.02

Other projects
กระแซะเข้ามาซิ [Originally by Pumpuang Duangjan] - 2018.02.11 
ใครพี่น้องเธอ [Tilly Birds x Pamiga] - 2019.05.24 
ความคิดถึงที่ฉันได้เคยส่งไปในคือที่ฝนโปรยลงมา [Three Man Down x Tilly Birds] - 2020.05.01  
จำเก่ง (Slipped Your Mind) [F.HERO x Tilly Birds] - 2020.06.18 
ให้เธอ [Originally by Wasan Chotikul] (Advertisement for The Pizza Company) - 2020.09.29 
อย่าอยู่เลย (Project Songland) - 2020.12.23
ยิ้มเธอคือทุกอย่าง (Always Here) [Tilly Birds featuring LULA x Elio by ANANDA] - 2021.11.30

Concert/Fan Meeting

 UNSPOKEN MOMENTS - 2019.12.22
 คนเดียวที่สำคัญ: Meeting เปิดอัลบั้ม ผู้เดียว - 2020.09.06
 We're Gonna Be OK - 2022.04.02

Notes

References

Thai musical groups
Thai alternative rock groups